Lars Velsand  (born 9 September 1941) is a Norwegian politician.

He was born in Gran to farmers Torstein Velsand and Aslaug Skøien. He was elected representative to the Storting for the period 1981–1985 for the Centre Party. He was reelected for the period 1985–1989.

References

1941 births
Living people
People from Gran, Norway
Centre Party (Norway) politicians
Members of the Storting